Miller High Life 500 may refer to the following NASCAR races:

 Los Angeles Times 500, Ontario Motor Speedway 1971-1972
 Bank of America Roval 400, Charlotte Motor Speedway 1983-1985
 Kids Free 325, Pocono Raceway 1986-1989

See also
 Miller 500 (disambiguation)